is a Japanese player of the shō, a traditional Japanese mouth organ.

Miyata was born on April 1, 1954, in Tokyo and graduated from the Kunitachi College of Music, where she majored in piano. While in school, she began studying gagaku music from Ono Tadamaro of the Imperial Household Agency.

Although the shō is generally associated with Japan's ancient gagaku court music, Miyata was among the first players of the instrument to specialize in contemporary classical music. She plays a specially constructed instrument with extra pipes, allowing for the use of more chromaticism.

The US composer John Cage (1912–1992) composed a number of works for Miyata just before his death. Cage met her during the 1990 Darmstadt summer course. She has also premiered works by Tōru Takemitsu, Toshi Ichiyanagi, Maki Ishii, Joji Yuasa, Klaus Huber, Toshio Hosokawa, and Uroš Rojko.

In 2005, Miyata performed in three songs by the Icelandic musician Björk, for the soundtrack album to Drawing Restraint 9, a film by Björk's contemporary media artist boyfriend Matthew Barney, about Japanese culture and whaling. Miyata also appeared in the film, playing the shō in one scene. Previously, one of Miyata's compositions, "Music for Shō and Harp (Cort Lippe)", was sampled in the Björk single, "Venus as a Boy".

She has performed in Japan, Australia, the United States, and Europe.

Discography
Chaya Czernowin: Die Kreuzung - on Mode Records 77 (1996)
John Cage Edition Vol. 23 - Two - on Mode Records 88 (2001)
John Cage Edition Vol. 26 - One - on Mode Records 108 (2003)
Helmut Lachenmann: Das Mädchen mit den Schwefelhölzern - ECM New Series (2 CDs) 1858/59 (2004)
Toshio Hosokawa - Landscapes  - ECM New Series 2095 (2011)

Honours
Medal with Purple Ribbon (2018)

References

Further reading

External links
Mayumi Miyata Profile at Mode Records
Mayumi Miyata Profile at AMATI

20th-century classical musicians
Japanese classical musicians
Japanese contemporary classical musicians
1945 births
Contemporary classical music performers
Shō players
Living people
Musicians from Tokyo
Recipients of the Medal with Purple Ribbon
Kunitachi College of Music alumni
20th-century Japanese musicians
21st-century classical musicians
21st-century Japanese musicians